Over The Long High Wall is a 1972 autobiographical work by the British writer J.B. Priestley.

References

Bibliography
 Klein, Holger. J.B. Priestley's Fiction. Peter Lang, 2002.

1972 books
Literary memoirs
Novels by J. B. Priestley
Heinemann (publisher) books